Xinghaiwan Subdistrict is a township-level division of the south of the Shahekou District of Dalian, Liaoning, China.

Administration
There are 17 communities within the subdistrict.

Communities:
Haizhou Community
Longjiang Road Community
Xinghai Park Community
Lianshan Community
Huawusuo Community
Xingnan Community
Xinghai Square Community
Xingbei Community
New Hope Community
Xingwen Community
Jiefang Community
Yuhua Community
Zhongshan Road Community
Jixian Community
Xinhua Community
Lianhuashan Community
Bihai Community

See also
List of township-level divisions of Liaoning
Shahekou

References

External links
星海湾街道党建网 

Dalian
Township-level divisions of Liaoning
Subdistricts of the People's Republic of China